Henrique (born Henrique Kinu a Mvemba; 1495 - 1531) was a prince of Kongo and a son of Afonso I. He became a Catholic priest shortly after the Christianization of the kingdom and dedicated his life to the catechism of the Kongolese, being appointed in 1518 titular bishop of Utica, in present-day Tunisia. He was the first central African bishop in history.

History

Shortly afterwards the king sent many of his children and other nobles to study in Coimbra, Portugal to aid him in modernizing the kingdom. Among those sent included his own son Henrique, who was sponsored by the king Dom Manuel I, himself.

On May 5, 1518, at the age of 24, the prince was elevated by Pope Leo X in Rome as Bishop of Utica, in present-day Tunisia, thus Henrique of Kongo was the first known bishop from central Africa in history. (Of course, the first black African bishops date from ancient Nubia and Axum during the first centuries of Christianity.) However, he never received the bishopric since it was only titular, since Tunisia at the time was dominated by Muslims.

In 1521 he returned to Kongo and was appointed governor of Mpangu, a province of the Kingdom. He would continue to serve in the Christianization of the kingdom until his death 10 years later.

References

1495 births
1531 deaths
University of Coimbra alumni
16th-century Roman Catholic titular bishops
16th-century Roman Catholic bishops in Africa
Kongolese royalty